Suite 16 is a 1994 Dutch-Belgian-British thriller film directed by Dominique Deruddere and starring Pete Postlethwaite, Antonie Kamerling, and Géraldine Pailhas.

Plot

The film takes place in an expensive hotel at the Côte d'Azur, where Chris, a young gigolo gets into a fight with one of his female customers and seemingly accidentally kills her. He runs off and hides in room 16, a penthouse where the rich but physically disabled man Glover lives. Glover offers him refuge from the police, alcohol, drugs and as many prostitutes as he wishes.

Chris then discovers that Glover records everything on video. He explains that he is so old and disabled that he can no longer have sex on his own, but still likes to watch others do it. He offers Chris much money to fulfil his sexual fantasies for him, so he can watch. Slowly but surely the fantasies get more perverted and sadomasochistic, until Glover offers Chris to murder a woman during the sex act. In exchange for much money they search for the best potential female victim.

Cast 
 Pete Postlethwaite - Glover
 Antonie Kamerling - Chris
 Géraldine Pailhas - Helen

External links 

1994 crime thriller films
1994 films
1990s erotic thriller films
Belgian crime thriller films
Belgian erotic thriller films
Dutch erotic thriller films
Dutch crime thriller films
Films about male prostitution in France
BDSM in films
Films about old age
Films set on the French Riviera
Films directed by Dominique Deruddere
1990s English-language films
English-language Belgian films
English-language Dutch films
British erotic thriller films
1990s British films